Casterton College, Rutland (previously Casterton Business and Enterprise College (CBEC) and Casterton Community College) is one of three secondary schools in the county of Rutland, England. Located in the village of Great Casterton, the school provides education for eleven- to sixteen-year-olds, as well as a Childcare Centre for the under fives and an adult education programme. It opened as Great Casterton Secondary Modern School in 1939.

The catchment area is the eastern part of Rutland including Cottesmore, Empingham and Ketton  but the college attracts many of its students from Stamford, across the Lincolnshire boundary.

Prior to academy conversion, the school had been rated as ‘outstanding’ in 2010. In December 2014, Ofsted rated the college as ‘requires improvement’ in all areas (teaching, behaviour, leadership and achievement).  The then principal Victoria Crosher defended the fall in rating as partly due to changes in the "C" boundary at GCSE.

With the withdrawal of the Tresham Institute from providing post-16 education in Rutland, CBEC in 2010  took over responsibility for Rutland College which was renamed Rutland County College. In 2015 it consulted on moving its entire sixth form from Oakham to its Casterton site. However, in March 2017, the college announced that the sixth form would be closing as not enough students showed interest to study there.

Casterton College is joined with Ryhall Primary School and also with Casterton Childcare Centre. This means that the total group of education ranges from nursery to 16: Casterton Childcare Centre, Ryhall Primary School, Casterton College.

References

External links
 Casterton College
 New science block

Academies in Rutland
Educational institutions established in 1939
1939 establishments in England
Secondary schools in Rutland